Barnstaple ( or ) is a river-port town in North Devon, England, at the River Taw's lowest crossing point before the Bristol Channel. From the 14th century, it was licensed to export wool and won great wealth. Later it imported Irish wool, but its harbour silted up and other trades developed such as shipbuilding, foundries and sawmills. A Victorian market building survives, with a high glass and timber roof on iron columns. The parish population was 24,033 at the 2011 census, and that of the built-up area 32,411 in 2018. The town area with nearby settlements such as Bishop's Tawton, Fremington and Landkey, had a 2020 population of 46,619.

Toponymy
The spelling Barnstable is obsolete, but retained by an American county and city. It appears in the 10th century and is thought to derive from the Early English bearde, meaning "battle-axe", and stapol, meaning "pillar", i. e. a post or pillar to mark a religious or administrative meeting place. The derivation from staple meaning "market", indicating a market from its foundation, is likely to be incorrect, as the use of staple in that sense first appears in 1423.

Barnstaple was formerly referred to as "Barum", as a contraction of the Latin form of the name ad Barnastapolitum in Latin documents such as the episcopal registers of the Diocese of Exeter.

Barum was mentioned by Shakespeare and the name was revived in the Victorian era in several novels. It remains in the names of a football team, a brewery and several businesses, and on numerous milestones. The former Brannam Pottery in Litchdon Street was known for its trademark "Barum" etched on the base of its products.

History

The earliest local settlement was probably at Pilton by the River Yeo, now a northern suburb. Pilton is recorded in the Burghal Hidage (c. 917) as a burh founded by Alfred the Great, and may have undergone a Viking attack in 893, but by the later 10th-century Barnstaple had taken over its local defence. It had a mint before the Norman Conquest.

The feudal barony of Barnstaple had its caput at Barnstaple Castle, granted by William the Conqueror to Geoffrey de Montbray, who appears as its holder in the 1086 Domesday Book. The barony fell to the Crown in 1095 after Montbray rebelled against William II. He transferred the barony to Juhel de Totnes, a feudal baron of Totnes. By 1107 Juhel had founded Totnes Priory and then Barnstaple Priory, of the Cluniac order, dedicated to St Mary Magdalene. After Juhel's son died intestate, the barony was split between the de Braose and Tracy families, before reuniting under Henry de Tracy. It then passed through several families, before ending in the hands of Margaret Beaufort (died 1509), mother of King Henry VII.

A market is first recorded in 1274. In the 1340s, merchants of the town claimed the rights of a free borough had been granted by King Athelstan in a lost charter. This was challenged periodically by successive lords of the manor, but it allowed merchants an unusual degree of self-government. The town's wealth in the Middle Ages rested on being a staple port licensed to export wool. It had an early merchant guild of St Nicholas. In the early 14th century it was Devon's third richest town after Exeter and Plymouth, and its largest textile centre outside Exeter until about 1600. The wool trade was aided by its port, from which five ships were contributed to a force sent to fight the Spanish Armada in 1588. Barnstaple was one of the "privileged ports" of the Spanish Company, (established 1577), whose armorials appear on two mural monuments to 17th-century merchants: Richard Beaple (died 1643), three times Mayor, and Richard Ferris (Mayor in 1632), who with Alexander Horwood received a payment from the Corporation of Barnstaple in 1630 for "riding to Exeter about the Spanish Company." in St Peter's Church, and on the decorated plaster ceiling of the old Golden Lion Inn, Boutport Street, now a restaurant beside the Royal and Fortescue Hotel.

The town benefited from rising trade with America in the 16th and 17th centuries, for the benefit of wealthy merchants who built impressive town houses. Some of these survive behind more recent frontages, for instance No. 62 Boutport Street, said to have one of the best plaster ceilings in Devon. The merchants also built almshouses, including Penrose's, and backed their legacy with elaborate family monuments inside the church.

By the 18th century, Barnstaple had ceased to be a woollen manufacturing town. Its output was replaced from Ireland, for which it was the main landing place; the raw materials were then taken by land to clothmaking towns in mid and east-Devon, such as Tiverton and Honiton. However, the harbour was silting up. As early as c. 1630 Tristram Risdon reported, "It hardly beareth small vessels." Bideford, lower down the estuary and benefiting from the scouring by the fast-flowing River Torridge, gradually took over the trade.

Although Barnstaple's trade in 1680–1730 was surpassed by Bideford's, it retained economic importance into the early 20th century, manufacturing lace, gloves, sail-cloth and fishing-nets, with extensive potteries, tanneries, sawmills and foundries, and some shipbuilding still carried on. The Bear Street drill hall dates from the early 19th century.

Barnstaple was one borough reformed by the Municipal Reform Act 1835. Between the 1930s and the 1950s it embraced the villages of Pilton, Newport, and Roundswell through ribbon development.

Government

Internal government
The historic Borough was long governed by the Mayor of Barnstaple and Corporation seated at Barnstaple Guildhall. The mayor served an annual term, with an election on the Feast of the Assumption of the Virgin (15 August) by a jury of twelve. However, it was a mesne borough, not held by the Mayor and Corporation as tenant in chief from the king, but from the feudal barony of Barnstaple, later known as lord of the Castle Manor or Castle Court. The Corporation tried several times to claim direct, free-borough status, but without success. The mayor was not recognised as such by the monarch, but merely as bailiff of the feudal baron. The borough powers were restricted under an inquisition ad quod damnum in the reign of Edward III, which from an inspection of evidence found that members of the corporation elected a mayor only by permission of the lord; legal pleas were held in a court at which the lord's steward, not the mayor, presided; the borough was taxed by the county assessors and the lord held the various assizes which the burgesses claimed. Indeed, the royal charter supposedly held by the corporation, granting it borough status, was suspected of being a forgery.

Since 1974, Barnstaple has been a civil parish governed by a town council.

Parliamentary status
From 1295 the Borough of Barnstaple had two members in the House of Commons until 1885, when this was reduced to one. The constituency was replaced for the 1950 general election by the large modern constituency of North Devon, held by Nick Harvey MP of the Liberal Democrats from 1992 until 2015, when Peter Heaton-Jones of the Conservative Party was elected and re-elected in 2017. Since 2019 the MP has been the Conservative Selaine Saxby.

Geography

Barnstaple, the main town in North Devon, claims to be the oldest borough in the United Kingdom. It was founded at the lowest crossing point of the River Taw, where its estuary starts to widen, about 7 miles (11 km) inland from Barnstaple Bay in the Bristol Channel. On the north side, the Taw is joined by the River Yeo, which rises on Berry Down near Combe Martin.

Most of the town lies on the east bank of the estuary, connected to the west by the ancient Barnstaple Long Bridge, with 16 arches. The town's early medieval layout still appears from the street plan and street names, with Boutport Street ("About the Port") following the curved line of a ditch outside the town walls. The area of medieval shipbuilding and repair is still called The Strand, an early word for shore.

Climate
Barnstaple has cool wet winters and mild wet summers. Mean high temperatures range from 9 C (48 F) in January to 21 C (70 F) in July. The record high is 34 C (94 F) and the record low −9 C (16 F). October is the wettest month with 103 mm (4.1 in) of rain. The mean annual rainfall is 862 mm (33.9 in), with rain on 138 days.

Demography
Barnstaple parish population in the 1801 census was 3,748, in 1901 9,698, and in 2001 22,497.

In 2011 the racial make-up was:
White British 93.9%
White Irish 0.3%
Other White 2.6%
Mixed race 1.2%
Asian 1.6%
Black 0.3%
Other 0.1%
As a major town, Barnstaple has a similar ethnic make-up to other south-west towns such as Truro and Cullompton. It is more diverse than the North Devon district (95.9% White British) and Devon as a whole (94.2% White British).

Economy

North Devon is some distance from Britain's traditional areas of industrial activity and population. In the late 1970s it gained several industrial firms due to the availability of central government grants for opening factories and operating them on low or zero levels of local taxation. This was scarcely successful, with few lasting beyond the few years that grants were available. One success was the manufacturing of generic medicines by Cox Pharmaceuticals (now branded Allergan), which moved in 1980 from a site in Brighton, Sussex. A lasting effect on the town has been the development and expansion of industrial estates at Seven Brethren, Whiddon Valley and Pottington.

Whilst the 1989 opening of the improved A361 connection to the motorway network assisted trade in ways such as weekend tourism, it was detrimental to some distribution businesses. These had previously seen the town as a base for local distribution, a need removed when travelling time to the M5 motorway was roughly halved.

With Barnstaple as the main shopping area for North Devon, retail work contributes to the economy. There are chain stores in the town centre and in the Roundswell Business Park, on the western fringe of the town. They include Tesco, with a hypermarket and superstore, and Sainsbury's, Lidl and Asda supermarkets. Multi-million pound redevelopment round the former Leaderflush Shapland works at Anchorwood Bank is creating a conservation area near the River Taw, hundreds of new homes, a retail area of shops, restaurants and leisure facilities. Asda also runs a petrol filling station, as do the Tesco stores and Sainsbury’s.

In 2005 unemployment in North Devon was 1.8–2.4 per cent, while median per capita wage for North Devon was 73 per cent of the UK national average. The level of work in the informal or casual sector is high, partly during seasonal tourism. By 2018 unemployment in North Devon had fallen from a 2010 high to 1.2 per cent, while median weekly full-time pay stood at £440 per week and average housing prices at £230,000. The number of businesses registered has risen by 370 since 2010 to 4,895. The year 2018 also saw government investment through Coastal Community grants and Housing Infrastructure funds £83 million to upgrade the North Devon Link Road.

Twin towns and sister cities
Barnstaple is twinned with:
 Barnstable, Massachusetts, United States
 Uelzen, Germany
 Trouville-sur-Mer, France
 Susa, Piedmont, Italy

Landmarks

Barnstaple has an eclectic mix of architectural styles, with the 19th century predominant, despite remnants of early buildings and several early plaster ceilings. St Anne's Chapel in the central churchyard can be seen as the most important ancient building to survive. Queen Anne's Walk was erected in about 1708 as a mercantile exchange. The Georgian Guildhall is also of interest, as is the Pannier Market beneath it. The museum has an "arts and crafts" appearance with tessellated floors and locally made staircase and decorative fireplaces.

Barnstaple Castle

Barnstaple Castle, founded in the 11th or 12th century and first mentioned the 12th century, may derive from Juhel (Joel) of Totnes in the early 12th century. King Stephen granted the castle to Henry de Tracy, a supporter of his. In the 12th century, stone buildings were built over the motte, possibly during Henry de Tracy's tenure. The castle descended through his family to another Henry de Tracy, who held the castle in 1228 when Henry III ordered the Sheriff of Devon to make sure its walls did not exceed  in height. By the death of the last Henry de Tracey in 1274, the castle had begun to decay. An inquisition of 1281 found that building materials had been removed from the castle without permission; by 1326 it was a ruin. Part of the castle walls blew down in a storm in 1601.

The Neo-Gothic Manor of Tawstock, originally Tawstock House, is two miles south of Barnstaple. It replaced an earlier Tudor mansion, built in 1574 but lost to a fire in 1787.

St Anne's Chapel
The Grade II listed St Anne's Chapel was restored in 2012 and is used as a community centre that can accommodate 60 people. It was an ancient Gothic chantry chapel, whose assets were acquired by the Mayor of Barnstaple and others in 1585, some time after the Dissolution of the Monasteries. A deed of feoffment dated 1 November 1585 exists in the George Grant Francis collection in Cardiff.

Pannier Market and Butchers' Row

Barnstaple has been the major market for North Devon since Saxon times. Demands for health regulation of its Victorian food market saw the construction in 1855–1856 of a Pannier Market, originally known as the Vegetable Market and designed by local architect R. D. Gould. This has a high glass-and-timber roof on iron columns. Market days are Monday – Crafts and General (April to December), Tuesday – General and Produce, Wednesday – Arts Collectables and Books, Thursday – Crafts and General, Friday – General and Produce, and Saturday – General and Produce.

Built on the far side of the street at the same time as the Pannier Market, Butchers' Row has ten shops with pilasters of Bath Stone and wrought-iron supports for an overhanging roof. Only one is still a butcher's, although successor shops still sell local farm goods. There is a baker, a delicatessen, two fishmongers, a florist and a greengrocer.

In early 2020, the local Council web site provided a summary of the Pannier Market: "Largely unchanged in over 150 years, Barnstaple's historic Pannier Market has a wide range of stalls, with everything from fresh local produce, flowers and crafts, to prints and pictures, fashion and... two cafés."

The Pannier Market, Butchers Row, has been a Grade II listed building since 1951.

Others

In Barnstaple
Albert Clock in The Square
Barnstaple Cemetery, the town's burial ground
 Museum of Barnstaple and North Devon
 Queen's Theatre
Barnstaple Heritage Trail
Businesses and Markets
Barnstaple Town F.C.
North Devon Crematorium, the largest crematorium in England, Wales and Northern Ireland
Penrose's Almshouses
Around Barnstaple
 Tarka Trail – The cycling and walking trails were established by Devon County Council, to celebrate Henry Williamson's 1927 novel Tarka the Otter. The book depicts Tarka's adventure travelling through North Devon's countryside.
 Arlington Court, 
 Lundy Island, ferry sails from Bideford, 
 Watersmeet House 
 The South West Coast Path National Trail runs through the town, and gives access to walks along the spectacular North Devon coast.
 Lynton & Barnstaple Railway,

Transport

In 1989, the A361 North Devon Link Road was built between Barnstaple and the M5 motorway, some 40 miles (65 km) to the east. Traffic congestion in the town was severe, but in May 2007, the Barnstaple Western Bypass was opened to take traffic towards Braunton and Ilfracombe away from the town centre and ancient bridge. The town's main square was remodelled as the entrance to the town centre, and The Strand was closed to traffic. The A39, the Atlantic Highway, follows after the A361 to Bideford and to Bude and then further towards Cornwall.

Most of Barnstaple's bus network is run by Stagecoach South West & Filers. The main bus station is at the junction of Queen Street and Belle Meadow Drive.

Main bus services:
19 roundswell – Barnstaple bus station- North Devon Hospital
21 Westward Ho! – Bideford – Fremington – Barnstaple – Braunton – West Meadow Road/Ilfracombe
21A Appledore – Bideford – Fremington – Barnstaple – Braunton – West Meadow Road/ georgeham 
71 Barnstaple – Torrington – (Holsworthy)/Shebbear
155 Barnstaple – South Molton – Tiverton – Exeter
301 Barnstaple – Ilfracombe – Combe Martin
309/310 Barnstaple – Lynton – Lynmouth

National Express has coach services to London, Heathrow Airport, Taunton, Bristol and Birmingham.

The nearest airport is Exeter Airport.

Railway

Barnstaple railway station is the terminus of a branch line from Exeter known as the Tarka Line after a local connection with Tarka the Otter. The station is near the end of the Long Bridge, on the opposite bank of the Taw to the town centre. Several other stations closed with the publication of the Reshaping of British Railways (the Beeching Axe) report in the 1960s. The surviving one had been opened on 1 August 1854 by the North Devon Railway (later the London and South Western Railway), although a service had operated from Fremington since 1848 for goods traffic only. It is now a terminus and much reduced in size, as part of the site has been used for the Barnstaple Western Bypass.

The Ilfracombe branch line brought the railway across the river into the town centre.  was situated close by the Castle Mound. It closed in 1898 in favour of a nearby  station at North Walk, which was also the terminus of the narrow-gauge Lynton and Barnstaple Railway, until that closed in 1935. The narrow-gauge line's main operating centre was at nearby .

A separate Barnstaple station, renamed Barnstaple (Victoria Road) in 1949, was opened to the east of the town in 1873 as the terminus of the Devon and Somerset Railway and later part of the Great Western Railway. A junction was provided to allow trains access to Barnstaple Junction and these ran through to Ilfracombe. It was closed in 1970.

Education

There are selected primary and secondary state schools and a tertiary college in Barnstaple.

In 2012, 58 per cent of Devon students achieved 5 GCSEs grade A* to C. The UK average is 59 per cent.

Petroc (formerly North Devon College) is a tertiary college offering a wide range of vocational and academic further education to more than 3,000 young people over 16. It was due to spend £100 million on a new campus to be opened on Seven Brethren in 2011, but this fell through when the Learning and Skills Council withdrew £75 million in funding in January 2009. Petroc was launched in September 2009, a year after NDC merged with Tiverton's East Devon College.

Religious sites

St Peter's Church is the parish church of Barnstaple. Its oldest parts probably date to the 13th century, though the nave, chancel and tower date from 1318, when three altars were dedicated by Bishop Stapledon. The north and south aisles were added in about 1670. The church has a notable broach spire, claimed by W. G. Hoskins to be the best of its kind in the country. Inside the church are many mural monuments to 17th-century merchants, such as Raleigh Clapham (died 1636), George Peard (died 1644) and Thomas Horwood (died 1658), reflecting the prosperity of the town at that time. The interior of the church was heavily restored by George Gilbert Scott from 1866, and then by his son John Oldrid Scott into the 1880s, leaving it "dark and dull", according to Hoskins.

Other religious buildings include St Anne's Chapel (a 14th-century chantry chapel, now a museum) in the parish churchyard. The Church of St Mary the Virgin in the suburb of Pilton is 13th-century and a Grade I listed building; Holy Trinity, built in the 1840s but necessarily rebuilt in 1867 as its foundations were unsound. It has a fine tower in the Somerset style. The Roman Catholic Church of the Immaculate Conception is said to have been built to designs supplied by Pugin, in Romanesque Revival style. The late 19th-century church of St John the Baptist stands in the Newport area of the town. There is a Baptist chapel of 1870, which includes a lecture hall and classrooms.

Sport
Cricket is played at Barnstaple and Pilton.

The association football club Barnstaple Town F.C. has been based at Mill Road since 1904 and plays in the Western Football League.

Rugby union is played at Barnstaple Rugby Football Club, whose first team plays in South West Premier, which is a fifth-tier league in the English rugby union system.

Several sports are available at Tarka Leisuire Centre, the home of Barnstaple Squash Club.

There are numerous bowling greens and tennis courts, including those at the Tarka Tennis Centre, which has six indoor courts and hosts the Aegon GB Pro-Series Barnstaple.

In February 2010 a Cornish Pilot Gig Rowing Club was established, bringing the sport to Castle Quay in the centre of Barnstaple.
 
Hockey is played at Taw Valley Ladies Hockey Club (along with a Junior set-up) and at North Devon Men's Hockey Club, both at Park School.

YouTube Appearance
The Coordinates "51.08240°, -4.05776°," which lead to a parking lot, are referenced in Drew Durnil's video "Maps That make you question everything...," in which the town is shown as a place where somebody witnessed a violent car crash.

Notable people

The following people have a connection with the town, in birth order:

Henry de Bracton (c. 1210 – c. 1258), cleric and jurist, was appointed Archdeacon of Barnstaple in 1264.
Robert Carey (1515–1586), landowner, became Barnstaple MP in 1553, Sheriff of Devon in 1555–1556 and Recorder of Barnstaple from 1560.
Richard Ferris (died 1649), merchant and MP for Barnstaple from 1640, founded Barnstaple Grammar School.
Pentecost Dodderidge (died c. 1650), was elected MP for Barnstaple in 1621, 1624 and 1625.
Richard Callicott (1604–1686), born in Barnstaple, was a leader of Massachusetts Bay Colony.
John Dodderidge (1610–1659), was elected MP for Barnstaple in 1646 and 1652.
John Loosemore (1618–1681), born in Barnstaple, was a noted builder of pipe organs, including the one in Exeter Cathedral.
John Gay (1685–1732), poet and dramatist
James Parsons (1705–1770), physician, antiquary and prolific medical author born in Barnstaple
Graham Gore (c. 1809 – c. 1847), naval officer and polar explorer lost during the Franklin Expedition
Henry Fry (1826–1892), born in Barnstaple, was a politician and merchant in British Columbia.
William Hoyle (1842–1918), born in Barnstaple, became a politician and furniture maker in Ontario.
Francis Carruthers Gould (1844–1925), caricaturist and cartoonist, was born in Barnstaple.
Fred M. White (1859–1935), author of science-fiction and disaster novels, spent his old age in Barnstaple and set three of his novels there.
Hubert Bath (1883–1945), born in Barnstaple, composed musical scores for many films in the 1920s and 1930s.
Francis Chichester (1901–1972), pioneering aviator and solo sailor
George Hart (1902–1987), first-class cricketer with Middlesex, died in Barnstaple
Charles Poynder (1910–1994), cricketer, born in Barnstaple
Stafford Somerfield (1911–1995), News of the World editor, was born in Barnstaple.
Brian Thomas (1912–1989), an artist best known for church paintings, born in Barnstaple
Racey Helps (1913–1970), children's writer and illustrator, lived in the town from 1962 until his death.
Jeremy Thorpe (1929–2014), Liberal Party leader, sat as MP for North Devon constituency centred on Barnstaple in 1959–1978.
Nigel Brooks (born 1936), musical composer and conductor of the BBC Concert Orchestra.
Johnny Kingdom (1939–2018), wildlife film-maker and photographer
John Keay (born 1941), historian and radio presenter born in Barnstaple
Richard Eyre (born 1943), a film, theatre, television and opera director, was born in Barnstaple.
Snowy White (born 1948), English guitarist known for having played with rock group Thin Lizzy, was born in Barnstaple.
Tim Wonnacott (born 1951), antiques expert and television presenter
David Spiegelhalter (born 1953), statistician
Dermot Murnaghan (born 1957), Sky News television broadcaster, was born in Barnstaple.
Anne-Marie Dawe (born 1968), born in Barnstaple, became the RAF's first fully qualified female navigator in 1991.
Tim Montgomerie (born 1970), political activist, blogger and columnist
Katie Hopkins (born 1975), columnist, was born in Barnstaple.
Phil Vickery (born 1976), rugby player and former England captain
Stuart Brennan (born 1982), BAFTA winning actor
George Friend (born 1987), professional footballer born in Barnstaple
Andy King (born 1988), professional footballer born in Barnstaple
Ian King, journalist and presenter on Sky News

Explanatory notes

References

Further reading
Papers of Barnstaple Borough 1150–1950, North Devon Record Office, B1

External links

Barnstaple Town Council Website 

Barnstaple Town Centre Website
Milestone in Westerway Plain – BARUM 1 (Milestone Society website)

 
Towns in Devon
Civil parishes in Devon
North Devon